Rissington is part of the name of four villages in Gloucestershire, England:

Great Rissington
Little Rissington
Upper Rissington
Wyck Rissington

In addition:
Rissington, Hawke's Bay in New Zealand